Charles Adam (5 April 1962 – 17 December 2012) was a Scottish footballer who played as a midfielder.

Adam played for a number of Scottish clubs, including St Johnstone and Dundee United, starting his career at Montrose. His sons Charlie and Grant are also professional footballers.

Adam died on 17 December 2012 at the age of 50. The cause of death was suicide.

Personal life
Adam was married to Eleanor (d. 2020), with whom he had five children: Charlie, Grant, Connor, Gary and Nicola.

References

External links

1962 births
2012 deaths
Footballers from Dundee
Scottish footballers
Association football midfielders
Montrose F.C. players
Downfield F.C. players
St Johnstone F.C. players
Brechin City F.C. players
Dundee United F.C. players
Partick Thistle F.C. players
Forfar Athletic F.C. players
Arbroath F.C. players
Scottish Football League players
Scottish Junior Football Association players
Suicides in Scotland
2012 suicides